"An Extempore upon a Faggot" is an eight-line poem of unknown authorship dating from the mid-17th century. It has been attributed to John Wilmot, 2nd Earl of Rochester, John Dryden, John Milton, and Sir John Suckling.

In September 2010, Jennifer Batt, lecturer in English at Jesus College, Oxford, published a version of the poem found in the 1708 Oxford and Cambridge Miscellany Poems, part of the Harding Collection at the Bodleian Library. The original anthology attributes this version to John Milton.

Poem verses

Notes

References
 
 

17th-century poems
English poems
Works about women
Works of uncertain authorship